Minden is a town in Montgomery County, New York, United States.  The population was 4,297 at the 2010 census. The town is located at the western edge of the county and south of the Mohawk River, which forms its northern border. It has possessed a post office from 1802 to 1903.

History 

This area was first settled by Europeans around 1748. It was probably named after Minden, in Germany. Among the early European settlers in the 18th century were Palatine Germans; these Protestants had come to New York as refugees from religious warfare. Their passage was paid by Queen Anne's government in exchange for their work at camps along the Hudson River, producing naval stores for England.

During the American Revolution, rebel colonists constructed a small fort in 1778 at Fort Plain village.  In 1780, the village was attacked by Tories and allied natives. They burned and sacked the community, but were not able to overcome the defenders at the fort.

Following the war, the town of Minden was formed in 1798 from the Town of Canajoharie. It was part of a rural area that was important for agriculture and dairy farming.

In 1985, a former farm in Minden was found to be the site of a cocaine processing lab set up at a former dairy farm by the Cali cartel based in Colombia. The drug lab was shut down following a state police and federal investigation of an explosion at the site, and the United States Marshals Service took control of the property.

"The 3.24 acre parcel, situated about 5 miles south of the city of Little Falls, once was the location of a farmhouse, garage, in-ground pool, stable building and dairy barn, parts of which were contaminated when toxic chemicals used to refine cocaine were dumped on the property between 1985 and 1987." The buildings were razed and removed, and the site had remediation done over a period of several years following the investigation. Toxic chemicals had been dumped on the property during the drug processing period. An estimated $15 million worth of cocaine was processed at the site. Eleven Colombian nationals were arrested and prosecuted in connection with this investigation; they were convicted and received sentences of 10 to 25 years. By 2011 the site was safe for other uses.

Geography

The northern town boundary  is defined by the Mohawk River. The New York State Thruway (Interstate 90) follows the course of the river.  The western town line is the border of Herkimer County, New York.

Demographics

As of the census of 2000, there were 4,202 people, 1,685 households, and 1,142 families residing in the town.  The population density was 82.3 people per square mile (31.8/km2).  There were 1,902 housing units at an average density of 37.3 per square mile (14.4/km2).  The racial makeup of the town was 98.57% White, 0.10% African American, 0.19% Native American, 0.43% Asian, 0.29% from other races, and 0.43% from two or more races. Hispanic or Latino of any race were 1.33% of the population.

There were 1,685 households, out of which 30.4% had children under the age of 18 living with them, 51.8% were married couples living together, 9.9% had a female householder with no husband present, and 32.2% were non-families. 26.6% of all households were made up of individuals, and 15.1% had someone living alone who was 65 years of age or older.  The average household size was 2.48 and the average family size was 2.98.

In the town, the population was spread out, with 25.3% under the age of 18, 7.7% from 18 to 24, 25.6% from 25 to 44, 23.8% from 45 to 64, and 17.6% who were 65 years of age or older.  The median age was 39 years. For every 100 females, there were 95.7 males.  For every 100 females age 18 and over, there were 91.6 males.

The median income for a household in the town was $28,333, and the median income for a family was $33,654. Males had a median income of $27,813 versus $21,437 for females. The per capita income for the town was $15,099.  About 9.0% of families and 12.0% of the population were below the poverty line, including 13.9% of those under age 18 and 9.1% of those age 65 or over.

Communities and locations in Minden 
Brookman Corners –  A hamlet in the northwestern part of the town.
Charlesworth Corners – A hamlet northwest of Fort Plain.
Freysbush – A hamlet southwest of Fort Plain village.
Fordsbush – A hamlet by the western town line.
Fort Plain – A village partly in the eastern edge of the town, on Otsquago Creek, south of the Mohawk River.
Hallsville – A location west of Fort Plain.
Hessville – A hamlet in the southeasernt corner of the town on Route 163.
Keesler Corners – A hamlet southwest of Fort Plain village.
Mindenville – A hamlet at the northern town boundary by the Mohawk River.
Moyers Corners – A location south of Mindenville.
Ripple Brook – A location in the southwestern part of the town.
Salt Springville – A hamlet straddling the southern town line.
Sand Hill – A hamlet northwest of Fort Plain village.
Valley Brook – A hamlet west of Fort Plain village on Route 80.
Willse Hill – An elevation in the southwestern corner of the town; partially located in the Towns of Stark and Springfield.

External links
  Town of Minden, NY
  Early history of Minden

References

Towns in Montgomery County, New York
Populated places on the Mohawk River
Populated places established in the 1740s